Lud Germain, "Ludovic Germain" was a Haitian actor and singer, probably naturalized French. He is best known for his role in L'Auberge Rouge (The Red Inn) (1951) as Fétiche.

He died in France in January 2015.

Biography 
Lud Germain probably arrived in France around the beginning of the 1930s.

In 1937, he was part of the "Haitian Trio", a musical ensemble that performed at the Pavilion of Haiti at the International Exhibition of Arts and Techniques of Paris.
This trio consisted of Bertin Depestre Salnave (flute, saxophone), Lud Germain (vocals), Maurice Thibault (piano).

Filmography 

Cinema
 1942 : L'Amant de Bornéo de Jean-Pierre Feydeau et René Le Hénaff - (rôle non crédité)
 1946 : 120, rue de la Gare de Léo Malet - Toussaint (rôle non crédité)
 1948 : Émile l'Africain de Robert Vernay - Bimbo
 1950 : Plus de vacances pour le Bon Dieu de Robert Vernay
 1950 : Pipe chien  de Henri Verneuil (court métrage)
 1951 : L'Auberge rouge de Claude Autant-Lara - Fétiche 1952 : Massacre en dentelles  de André Hunebelle - Sam Barnett 1952 : Elle et moi  de Guy Lefranc - Bouboudou 1953 : Mon frangin du Sénégal  de Guy Lacourt - le Noir engagé comme commis 1953 : La môme vert de gris de Bernard Borderie - le domestique de Harley Chase  (rôle non crédité)
 1953 : Lettre ouverte  de Alex Joffé
 1958 : Maxime de Henri Verneuil : le serviteur noir 1958 : Vive les vacances de Jean-Marc Thibault - Kikouyou 1959 : J'irai cracher sur vos tombes de Michel Gast - Harrison, le serviteur des Shannon 1959 : Les Tripes au soleil de Claude Bernard-Aubert - (rôle non crédité)
 1959 : Les Motards de Jean Laviron
 1960 : Les Jeux de l'amour de Philippe de Broca 
 1961 : The Nina B. Affair de Robert Siodmak : un Africain lors de la conférence
 1961 : Le Rendez-vous de Jean Delannoy

 Television
 1958 : Hôtel des neiges, téléfilm de Jean Vernier - Zazaquel 1961 : Épreuves à l'appui (Les Cinq Dernières Minutes nº 21) de Claude Loursais (série TV) - Le cordonnier 1965 : Rocambole - épisode : La Belle jardinière (série TV)

Dubbing

 Everett Brown -  Grand Sam : Autant en emporte le vent (1939) 
 Clarence Muse - Jehu : Quand les tambours s'arrêteront (1951)
 Ben Johnson - Kimani : Simba'' (1955)

Music
Album: Mississipi (1950)

References

External links 
 
 Fiche de Lud Germain sur cinema-francais.fr

Haitian male actors
2015 deaths
Year of birth missing
Haitian emigrants to France
People from Port-au-Prince